Salwick is a village between Kirkham and Preston in Lancashire, England. The village is largely rural and is an extension of the smaller Clifton to the south. It is in the borough of Fylde, and in the Parliamentary Constituency of Fylde, and forms part of the civil parish of Newton-with-Clifton.

The area of "Clifton With Salwick" was in the Archdeaconry of Richmond in the Diocese of Chester.

The etymology of Salwick is unclear. The "wick" may come from Old English wic, meaning an earlier Romano-British settlement specialised in farming; but the "Sal(w)" element is unclear.

Salwick is the home of the Springfields nuclear fuel manufacturing plant operated by Westinghouse Electric Company, which dominates the village.

In November 2021 a poultry farm near Salwick was the location for an outbreak of Bird Flu (Avian influenza H5N1). Temporary control zones spanning  and  around the property were set up, spanning from Blackpool to Fulwood.

See also
Listed buildings in Newton-with-Clifton

References

External links

 Genealogy of Salwick

Villages in Lancashire
Geography of the Borough of Fylde